Dielsiocharis is a genus of flowering plants belonging to the family Brassicaceae.

Its native range is Southern Turkmenistan to Iran.

The genus name of Dielsiocharis is a compound, combining Diels from a German botanist Ludwig Diels (1874–1945), and also Charis, a Greek goddess of charm, beauty.

Known species:

Dielsiocharis bactriana 
Dielsiocharis kotschyi

References

Brassicaceae
Brassicaceae genera